Jan Stussy (1921–1990) was an American artist, film producer, and professor. He was a professor emeritus from the University of California, Los Angeles (UCLA), he taught there for 42 years. He was awarded an Academy Award for the documentary film, Gravity Is My Enemy (1977). Stussy was a prolific painter and printmaker.

Early life and education 
Jan Stussy was born on August 13, 1921 in Benton County, Missouri. While he was young, his family moved to Bellflower, California. He attended Excelsior High School, graduating in 1939.

Stussy attended classes at Long Beach City College, and the Art Center (now the ArtCenter College of Design), under Barse Miller. At the University of California, Los Angeles he obtained a B.F.A. degree in 1943, and studied under George J. Cox. He served as a Naval Intelligence officer during World War II. After his military service, he attended the University of Southern California (USC) and obtained a M.F.A. degree in 1953. Stussy had studied lithography with Lynton Richards Kistler and Joe Funk, and painting and drawing at USC with Francis de Erdely, and Stanton Macdonald-Wright.

Stussy was married to artist Maxine Kim (née Carlyle) in 1949, they met while working as teaching assistants at UCLA. Together they had one child, however the marriage ended in divorce.

Career 
He was elected as vice-president of the California Water Color Society in 1950.

Stussy taught visual arts at the University of California, Los Angeles, from 1942 until 1989. He also taught at the UCLA Extension, from 1957 to 1980.

In 1977, Stussy co-produced the documentary Gravity Is My Enemy with John C. Joseph. The film portrays one of Stussy's art students, Mark Hicks, who has been paralyzed since a childhood accident and paints and draws by holding tools between his teeth. Both producers received an Academy Award in 1978 at the 50th Academy Awards in the Best Documentary Short Film category.

Death and legacy 
He died on July 31, 1990 in Brentwood, West Los Angeles of a brain tumor.

Stussy's work is found in public museum collections including the National Gallery of Art, Smithsonian American Art Museum, Los Angeles County Museum of Art, Norton Simon Museum, Amon Carter Museum of American Art, Museum of Modern Art, Oakland Museum of California, Hammer Museum, and Fine Arts Museums of San Francisco.

References

Further reading 

 Boime, Albert. The Odyssey of Jan Stussy in Black and White: Anxious Visions and Uncharted Dreams (1995), Los Angeles, CA: Jan Stussy Foundation.

External links 
 
Jan Stussy papers, 1955-1985, Archives of American Art, Smithsonian Institution

1921 births
1990 deaths
People from Benton County, Missouri
Artists from Los Angeles
University of California, Los Angeles alumni
University of Southern California alumni
American documentary film producers
20th-century American painters